Ezequiel Montes is a municipality in the Mexican state of Querétaro. Its seat is the town of the same name, founded in 1861 by Julián Velázquez Feregrino. Its original name was Corral Blanco.

The municipality was created in 1940, including the nearby towns of Bernal and Villa Progreso.  As such, the municipality contains Saint Michael's temple, which was built from the 16th to the 18th centuries by the indigenous Otomies who lived in Querétaro and Jilotepec de Abasolo.

The main attractions are La Peña de Bernal, Freixenet vineyards and Villa Progreso.

External links
Enciclopedia de los Municipios
Villa Progreso

Populated places in Querétaro
1940 establishments in Mexico